Miguel Torres Bernades (born 24 January 1946) is a Spanish former freestyle and medley swimmer who competed in the 1960 Summer Olympics, in the 1964 Summer Olympics, and in the 1968 Summer Olympics.

Notes

References

External links
 
 
 
 

1946 births
Living people
Spanish male medley swimmers
Spanish male freestyle swimmers
Olympic swimmers of Spain
Swimmers at the 1960 Summer Olympics
Swimmers at the 1964 Summer Olympics
Swimmers at the 1968 Summer Olympics
Mediterranean Games gold medalists for Spain
Mediterranean Games medalists in swimming
Swimmers at the 1963 Mediterranean Games
European Aquatics Championships medalists in swimming